Lord Shiva was the ishta devta of King Janaka in Mithila Kingdom. King Janaka did many penances devoted to Lord Shiva at  the different places of the Mithila Kingdom.  After the appearance of the lord Shiva at these places, he established Shivalinga there. Below is the list of those. These Shivalinga are also known as the Jyotirlinga of Mithila.

List of Shiva temples established by King Janaka 

 Kalyaneshwar Mahadev Mandir: According to the text Ramcharitmanas of Tulsi Das, the King Janaka did penance here devoted to his ishta devta Lord Shiva. Lord Shiva was pleased with the penance of the King Janaka and appeared in the form of Kalyaneshwar. Then King Janaka established a Shivling here in the devotion to Lord Shiva and God Viswakarma built the temple around the Shivling. The temple is also considered as one of the gates of the ancient capital of Mithila.
 Jaleshwar Nath Mahadev Mandir: It is considered to be the second gateway of ancient Mithila Dham. Jaleshwar Nath Mahadev was also established by King Janaka. It is said that King Janaka had established Shivling at the four entrances of Mithila Dham, which is still present today.
 Haleshwar Sthan: It is one of the holiest Hindu temples dedicated to the Lord Shiva. According to myth, King Janaka founded a temple of Lord Shiva on the occasion of Putra Yeshti Yajna in Mithila Kingdom. The temple was named as Haleshwarnath Mandir.
 Chhireshwar Nath Mahadev Mandir
 Kapileshwar Mandir, Janakpur
 Satoshar Sthan: There is an ancient temple of Lord Shiva known as Sapteshwar Nath Mahadev Mandir. It is believed that the shivling of the temple was established by the King Janaka in Mithila . It is one of the four shivlingas at the four corners of the ancient capital of Mithila. It is very important temple for the pilgrimage of the Mithila Madhya Parikrama. According to legend, this place was the Ashram of Saptrishi in Mithila.

References 

Shiva temples
Mithila
Shaivism
Lists of Hindu temples